Take a Letter, Darling is a 1942 American romantic comedy film directed by Mitchell Leisen and starring Rosalind Russell. It was nominated for three Academy Awards; Best Cinematography, Best Score and Best Art Direction (Hans Dreier, Roland Anderson, Samuel M. Comer).

Plot
A struggling painter (Fred MacMurray) takes a job as private secretary to a tough female advertising executive (Rosalind Russell). While working together to win the account of a tobacco company, they end up falling in love.

Cast
 Rosalind Russell as A.M. MacGregor
 Fred MacMurray as Tom Verney
 Macdonald Carey as Jonathan Caldwell
 Constance Moore as Ethel Caldwell
 Robert Benchley as G.B. Atwater
 Charles Arnt as Fud Newton (as Charles E. Arnt)
 Cecil Kellaway as Uncle George
 Kathleen Howard as Aunt Minnie
 Margaret Seddon as Aunt Judy
 Dooley Wilson as Moses
 George Reed as Sam French
 Margaret Hayes as Sally French
 Sonny Boy Williams as Micky Dowling
 John Holland as Ex-Secretary

Radio adaptation

References

External links

1942 films
1942 romantic comedy films
American romantic comedy films
American black-and-white films
Films scored by Victor Young
Films directed by Mitchell Leisen
Paramount Pictures films
1940s English-language films
1940s American films